Axylou is a village in the Paphos District of Cyprus, located 12 north of Acheleia.

References

Communities in Paphos District